Thayumanavar is a 1938 Indian Tamil-language film produced and directed by T. R. Sundaram. The film brought to screen the life story of Hindu Saint and Philosopher Thayumanavar who lived in the 18th century. Carnatic Singer and actor M. M. Dandapani Desikar featured in the title role.

Plot 
Muthukrishnan Naiker was the ruler of Thiruchirapalli. He visited the temple at Vedaranyam. The Dharmakartha (trustee) of the temple gave a grand welcome to the ruler. Impressed by the reception, the ruler made the dharmakartha a minister of his court. A son is born to the minister who names him as Thayumanavan. Meanwhile, Muthukrishnan Naiker died and his son came to the throne. He appointed Thayumanavan as his minister. Thayumanavan was brilliant. He helped the king to develop the country. However, Thayumanavan was more inclined towards philosophy and divinity. Soon, the ruler becomes aware of the divine power of Thayumanavan and became a disciple. Thayumanavan performed many miracles, eventually his mortal remains and became a saint.

Cast 
The list is adapted from the film's songbook

Male Cast
 M. M. Dandapani Desikar as Thayumanavar
 Vidwan C. S. Selvarathnam Pillai as Kediliyappar
 T. E. Krishnamachariar as 2nd King, Maunaguru
 Prabhat Venkata Rao as First King, Lord Shiva
 P. G. Venkatesan as Yogi, Innocent Husband
 S. N. Sivakozhundhu as Sivachidambaram, Prabhu
 K. Sivaraman as Arulaiyar
 Master Vedhamoorthi as Young Thayumanavan
 Master Krishnamoorthi as Beggar Boy
 N. Ramasami Pillai as Fake Sami
 V. M. Ezhumalai as Fake Sami
 T. V. Devanatha Iyengar as Comedian
 S. L. Venkatanarayana Iyengar as Comedian
 P. Ramasami Udayar as Comedian

Female Cast
 M. S. Devasena as Queen Meenakshi
 B. Saradambal as Gajavalli Madam
 N. S. Rathnambal as Mother Who Lost Her Son
 P. S. Gnanam as Irrational Wife
 K. T. Sakku Bai as Mattuvarkuzhali
 Aparanji as Fake Lords's Teacher
 Devaram Rajammal as Chetty Girl's Mother
 K. Saraswathi as Chetty Girl
 Sakunathala as Personal Friend
 Jeevarathnam as Girl Next Door
Support Cast
R. Somasundaram, K. Ram Singh,K. P. Lakshmanan, K. Chidambaram, and Devaraj.

Production 
During the 1930s many films were made with life stories of religious saints. M. M. Dandapani Desikar who was well trained in Carnatic music and with fluency in religious lore and was the obvious choice of producers. Earlier he featured in similar role in Pattinathar and later in Nandanar.

Soundtrack 
Music was composed by  G. Pichala Narasimha Rao and lyrics were penned by Papanasam Sivan. The songs  were recorded by Sardar Eswara Singh. Most of the songs were compositions of the Saint himself who sang nearly 1500 songs. There were 31 songs in the film most of which were sung by M. M. Dandapani Desikar. Singers are Vidwan C. S. Selvarathnam Pillai, P. G. Venkatesan, Master Vedhamoorthi, Master Krishnamoorthi, N. S. Rathnambal, M. M. Dandapani Desikar, P. S. Gnanam, M. S. Devasena, and the chorus.

Orchestra
 Rajukaru – Dilruba, Sitar, Organ
 T. S. Krishna Pillai – Fiddle
 G. H. Anjaneyalu – Tabla
 K. Rengaiya Naidu – Clarinet
 T. M. Ibrahim – Piano

Lost film 
No print of the film is known to exist today.

Reception 
Film historian Randor Guy wrote in 2012 that the film is "Remembered for the rich singing of Dandapani Desikar and the scenes featuring holy places."

References

External links 

Films about Hinduism
Hindu devotional films
Lost Indian films
Indian black-and-white films
1938 lost films
1938 films
1930s Tamil-language films
Films scored by G. Pichala Narasimha Rao